Kenneth John Poole (born 27 April 1934 in Thurgarton) is an English former first-class cricketer active 1955–57 who played for Nottinghamshire.

See also
Cricket in England
List of cricket grounds in England and Wales
List of Nottinghamshire County Cricket Club players

References

English cricketers
Nottinghamshire cricketers
Living people
1934 births